is a 1972 film, which is a sequel to Wandering Ginza Butterfly. The film was directed by Kazuhiko Yamaguchi, who co-wrote it with Isao Matsumoto. The film stars Meiko Kaji and Sonny Chiba.

Plot
Seeking revenge for the death of her father, Nami is now on the hunt for Hoshiden. After arriving in Tokyo, Nami once again becomes a hostess at a Ginza club, while searching every alley and gambling spot for Hoshiden, with the help of Ryuji.

Cast
 Meiko Kaji as Nami Higuchi
 Junzaburo Ban as Asai Senzo
 Tamayo Mitsukawa as Asai Hanae
 Shingo Yamashiro as Karashishi Monjiro
 Yukie Kagawa as Miyoko
 Hideo Murota as Tadokoro
 Akira Kume as Tani
 Fujio Suga as Aihoshi
 Sonny Chiba as Higashi Ryuji

References

External links

1972 films
Films directed by Kazuhiko Yamaguchi
1970s Japanese-language films
1970s crime thriller films
Toei Company films
Films about hanafuda
1970s Japanese films